André Marchand may refer to:

 André Marchand (painter) (1907–1997), French painter
 André Marchand (politician) (1926–2011), Canadian politician